Maesdu Park (known as OPS Wind Arena for sponsorship reasons) is a multi-sport stadium in Llandudno, Wales. It is currently used mostly for football matches, and is the home ground of JD Cymru North League team Llandudno F.C. The 2016 Welsh League Cup final was held at the ground.

History
Maesdu Park was first opened in 1991, with the club moving from the town's Oval ground which had hosted football after Llandudno's previous ground was sold for use as an Asda store in the 1970s. Floodlights were added in 1994 and the following season the club constructed a small clubhouse and two small stands providing 130 seats. A new press box, changing rooms and new grandstands have since been completed.

An artificial pitch was installed at the stadium in the summer of 2010.

In a deal with Giant Hospitality in August 2016, the stadium was renamed. A later sponsorship deal saw the ground named the OPS Wind Arena.

From January 2019, Bangor City played at the ground when water and electricity were cut off from their Nantporth home due to debt. Llandudno were forced to play a home game at Nantporth in October 2022 due to safety concerns over the OPS Wind Arena pitch

Clubhouse
The stadium has its own bar, The Crossbar, which is available for hire as well as opening on match days.

References

Football venues in Wales
Stadiums in Wales
Buildings and structures in Llandudno